Jimmy Kelly (born 6 February 1954) is a Northern Irish former professional footballer who played in the Football League and in the North American Soccer League during the 1970s and early 1980s.

Career
After beginning his career in his native Northern Ireland with Glentoran and Cliftonville, he moved to English First Division side Wolverhampton Wanderers in December 1971. Kelly had to wait until 5 February 1974 to make his club debut, in a 0–1 defeat at Sheffield United, and was not selected again for two further years.

He gained playing time by joining NASL side Portland Timbers in 1975, and also managed a run of nine of Wolves' final ten fixtures of the 1975–76 season as they unsuccessfully battled relegation. After only a handful of further appearances for Wolves during the following two seasons he signed for nearby Walsall in 1978.

In 1981, he returned to North America to again play for the Portland Timbers.

References

1954 births
Living people
Sportspeople from County Antrim
Association footballers from Northern Ireland
Glentoran F.C. players
Cliftonville F.C. players
Wolverhampton Wanderers F.C. players
Wrexham A.F.C. players
Walsall F.C. players
Kidderminster Harriers F.C. players
Portland Timbers (1975–1982) players
NIFL Premiership players
English Football League players
North American Soccer League (1968–1984) players
North American Soccer League (1968–1984) indoor players
Expatriate soccer players in the United States
Association football wingers